Serotonin acetyltransferase may refer to:
 Arylamine N-acetyltransferase
 Serotonin N-acetyltransferase